This is a list of defunct (Mainly American) consumer brands which are no longer made and usually no longer mass-marketed to consumers. Brands in this list may still be made, but are only made in modest quantities and/or limited runs as a nostalgic or retro style item.

Automobiles

Airlines

Banking
 Barnett Bank
 Bank One Corporation
 Fleet Bank
 Lincoln Savings and Loan Association
 National City Corp.
 Valley National Bank of Arizona
 Washington Mutual
 Lehman Brothers

Energy
 Clark Brands
 Enron
 Gulf Oil
 Standard Oil of Ohio

Food and beverages

Processing, distributing and retail companies

 Beatrice Foods
 Bill Knapp's
 Blue Valley Creamery Company 
 Borden, Inc.
 Burger Chef
 Freezer Queen 
 Pet, Inc.
 Revco
 Sexton Foods
 ShowBiz Pizza Place
 White Tower Hamburgers

Dairy 
 Golden Guernsey
 Louis Trauth Dairy
 Swerve

Pet food
 Ken-L Ration
 Ralston Purina

Food items
 Arch Deluxe 
 Gerber Singles

Alcoholic beverages

Breakfast cereals
 C3PO's Cereal
 Crazy Cow
 Crispy Critters 
 Cröonchy Stars 
 Fruit Brute
 Halfsies
 Hidden Treasures 
 Ice Cream Cones 
 Kaboom
 King Vitamin 
 Kream Krunch 
 Morning Funnies
 Nerds Cereal
 Nintendo Cereal System
 Quake
 Quisp
 S'mores Grahams
 Sprinkle Spangles
 Yummy Mummy

Soft drinks

Heavy manufacturing and processing 

 Bonney Forge Corporation
 Coes Wrench Company
 Columbus Castings
 Dormeyer Corporation
 Fokker
 Goodell-Pratt
 McDonnell Douglas
 McKaig-Hatch
 National Amusement Devices
 North Brothers Manufacturing Company
 TRW Inc.
 Vlchek Tool Company
 Westinghouse Electric Corporation

Media 
 4Kids Entertainment
 Auckland Star
 Auckland Sun
 The Cincinnati Post
 Columbia House
 DuMont Television Network
 UPN
 The WB

Professional services 
 Lehman Brothers
 Arthur Andersen
 Drexel Burnham Lambert

Retail

Chain stores

Clothing and accessories 
 Avenue
 Elgin National Watch Company
 I. Magnin
 Jean Lassale
 Rike Kumler Co.

Consumer electronics and software 
 Apple Newton
 Coby Electronics Corporation
 Commodore International
 Microsoft Band
 Microsoft Kin
 Microsoft Lumia 
 RCA
 Sega Dreamcast
 Windows Mobile
 Windows Phone 
 Zune
 Zune HD
 Compaq
 iPod 
 PS2

Home consumer products 

 Burma-Shave
 Darkie
 Gleem 
 Sani Flush

Photography 
 Instamatic
 Land Camera
 Minolta

Toy manufacturers 
 Coleco
 Dinky Toys
 Kenner Products
 Louis Marx and Company
 Trendmasters

Telecommunications 
 GTE
 MCI Inc.

Shipping and mass transportation

See also

 Lists of brands
 List of defunct automobile manufacturers of the United States
 List of defunct breweries in the United States
 List of defunct department stores of the United States
 McDonald's Deluxe line
 New Coke

References

 
Lists of brands
Brands